The Oakland Athletics' 2000 season was the team's 33rd in Oakland, California. It was also the 100th season in franchise history. The team finished first in the American League West with a record of 91-70.

The A's, in winning the division, snapped an eight-year postseason drought. The division championship was also the first of the so-called "Moneyball" era. Over the next six seasons, the Athletics would reach the postseason a total of four additional times.

The season saw the debuts of eventual ace starters Barry Zito and Mark Mulder. These two pitchers, along with Tim Hudson (who had debuted one year prior), would comprise the top of Oakland's rotation (known popularly as the "Big Three") until the end of the 2004 season. Of the three, Hudson fared the best in 2000; he won twenty games (the most in the American League) and reached the All-Star Game in his first full season as a starter. For his efforts, Hudson finished second in that year's American League Cy Young Award voting.

The Athletics also boasted a strong offense. The team scored 947 runs (an Oakland record) over the course of the season; this figure was the third-highest in the American League. The offense was led by Jason Giambi, who won the American League MVP Award at the end of the season. The team collectively hit 239 home runs in 2000 (also an Oakland record); in total, nine different Athletics hit at least ten home runs.

The Athletics fought the Seattle Mariners in the standings for most of the season. In the end, the Athletics narrowly prevailed; they finished only half a game ahead of the 91-71 Mariners (who won the AL Wild Card). The Athletics then played the New York Yankees in the ALDS. They would lose the best-of-five series three games to two.

Offseason
 December 30, 1999: Scott Service was signed as a free agent by the Athletics.
 December 30, 1999: Rich Becker was signed as a free agent by the Athletics.

Regular season
 May 29, 2000: Randy Velarde of the Athletics had an unassisted triple play. He caught a liner, tagged the runner coming from first base and touched second base.

Season standings

Record vs. opponents

Notable transactions
 May 5, 2000: Rich Becker was released by the Athletics.
 June 5, 2000: Rich Harden was drafted by the Athletics in the 17th round of the 2000 Major League Baseball Draft. Player signed May 18, 2001.
 July 6, 2000: Mike Mohler was signed as a free agent by the Athletics.
 August 30, 2000: Jorge Velandia was traded by the Athletics to the New York Mets for Nelson Cruz.

Roster

Player stats

Batting

Starters by position
Note: Pos = Position; G = Games played; AB = At bats; H = Hits; Avg. = Batting average; HR = Home runs; RBI = Runs batted in

Other batters
Note: G = Games played; AB = At bats; H = Hits; Avg. = Batting average; HR = Home runs; RBI = Runs batted in

Pitching

Starting pitchers
Note: G = Games pitched; IP = Innings pitched; W = Wins; L = Losses; ERA = Earned run average; SO = Strikeouts

Other pitchers
Note; G = Games pitched; IP = Innings pitched; W = Wins; L = Losses; ERA = Earned run average; SO = Strikeouts

Relief pitchers
Note: G = Games pitched; W = Wins; L = Losses; SV = Saves; ERA = Earned run average; SO = Strikeouts

Postseason

Game 1, October 3
Network Associates Coliseum in Oakland, California

Game 2, October 4
Network Associates Coliseum in Oakland, California

Game 3, October 6
Yankee Stadium in New York City

Game 4, October 7
Yankee Stadium in New York City

Game 5, October 8
Network Associates Coliseum in Oakland, California

Composite Box
2000 ALDS (3-2): New York Yankees over Oakland Athletics

Awards and records
 Jason Giambi, AL MVP award
 Jason Giambi, Hutch Award
2000 Major League Baseball All-Star Game
 Jason Giambi, American League first baseman, starter
 Tim Hudson, pitcher, reserve
 Jason Isringhausen, pitcher, reserve

Farm system

References

2000 Oakland Athletics team page at Baseball Reference
2000 Oakland Athletics team page at www.baseball-almanac.com

Oakland Athletics seasons
American League West champion seasons
Oakland Athletics season
Oakland Athletics Season
Oakland Athletics season